Longaniza (or ) is a Spanish sausage (embutido) similar to a chorizo and also closely associated with the Portuguese linguiça. Its defining characteristics are interpreted differently from region to region.  It is popular in the cuisines of several regions of Spain, Argentina, Uruguay, Puerto Rico, Dominican Republic, El Salvador, Guatemala, Mexico and Chile. In the Philippines, it is called longganisa and has hundreds of variants with different vernacular tastes and forms due to the 144 ethno-linguistic groups of the archipelago.

Varieties by country

Spain
In Spain, longaniza is similar to salchichón, though thinner; both differ from chorizo in that black pepper is used for them instead of paprika and may have different spices in them like nutmeg.

Argentina and Uruguay 
In Argentina and Uruguay, longaniza is a very long, cured and dried  pork sausage that gets its particular flavour from ground anise seeds. This results in a very particular aroma, and a mildly sweet flavour that contrasts with the strong salty taste of the stuffing. It is used mainly as an appetizer or in sandwiches, and very rarely cooked.

Chile and Peru
In Chile and Peru, longaniza may be eaten during a barbecue with bread as a choripán. The city of Chillán is known for its longanizas. Chillán's football team Ñublense are nicknamed The Clockwork Longaniza (Spanish: La longaniza mecánica). During the festivities of the 18th of September, longaniza is prepared in great quantities.

Mexico 
Mexican longaniza tends to be longer than Mexican chorizo and is spicier. It is commonly chopped up and mixed with eggs with tomato and chili to make the dish longanisa con huevo, and is eaten with tortillas in the morning.

Puerto Rico (U.S.) 
Puerto Rican style longaniza is made of pork, but also is made with chicken or turkey. The red orange color is from the addition of annatto seeds. Rice with longaniza is a popular dish.

Dominican Republic 

Since colonial times, Dominican style longaniza has been prepared with the juice of bitter oranges (or lime), garlic, oregano and salt. For the casing, pork intestines are used. Then the longaniza is left to cure in the sun for some days. It is eaten fried in its own fats or in vegetable oil. Quality varies considerably because it is generally home-made. Best quality longaniza usually has a 70% lean fat content.

Philippines 

Longaniza or longganisa (also called chorizo, choriso, tsoriso, or soriso in Visayan regions) refers to sausages flavoured with spices. They are commonly dyed red, yellow, or orange with achuete seeds. 

Longganisa are usually fresh or smoked sausages, typically made with varying ratios of lean meat and fat, along with garlic, black pepper, salt (usually coarse sea salt), saltpeter, muscovado or brown sugar, and vinegar. Variants may add paprika, chili, anise liqueur, and other spices. Most longganisa are classified primarily by either being sweet (jamonado or hamonado; Philippine Spanish: longaniza jamonada) or garlicky (de recado or derecado; Philippine Spanish: longaniza de recado, "spice-mixed longganisa" or literally "longanissa laden with a set of spices"). Most longganisa are made with pork. Unlike the Spanish chorizo and longaniza, Filipino longganisa can also be made with chicken, beef, or even tuna. Commercial varieties are made into links, but homemade sausages may be simple patties (bulk sausages) without the casing, known as longganisang hubad or in Philippine English as "skinless sausages".

There are numerous kinds of sausages in the Philippines, usually unique to a specific region like Vigan longganisa, Alaminos longganisa, and Chorizo de Cebu. There are also a few dry sausages like Chorizo de Bilbao and Chorizo de Macao. The most widely known longganisa variant in Philippine cuisine is the Pampanga longganisa, because it is commercially mass-produced.

Below are some of the more known variants of longganisa in the Philippines (along with their regions of origin, where applicable):

 Alaminos longganisa - pork longganisa de recado from Pangasinan
 Cabanatuan longganisa (or Batutay) - beef longganisa from Nueva Ecija
 Calumpit longganisa (or Longganisang Bawang) (Bulacan)
 Chorizo de Bilbao - dry pork longganisa characterized by the use of paprika
 Chorizo de Cebu (or Longganisa de Cebu) - pork longganisa hamonada from Cebu
 Chorizo de Macao - dry pork longganisa characterized by the use of anise liqueur
 Chorizo Negrense (or Bacolod Longganisa) - pork longganisa from Negros Island
 Longaniza de Guinobatan - pork longganisa de recado from Guinobatan, Albay
 Lucban longganisa - pork longganisa de recado from Quezon characterized by the use of oregano
 Pampanga longganisa - pork longganisa hamonada from Pampanga
 Pinuneg - pork blood sausage from the Cordillera Administrative Region
 Tuguegarao longganisa (or Longganisang Ybanag) - pork longganisa de recado from Cagayan Valley
 Vigan longganisa - pork longganisa de recado from the Ilocos Region

See also
List of sausages

References

Chilean sausages
Mexican cuisine
Puerto Rican cuisine
Philippine sausages
Spanish sausages
Dominican Republic cuisine
Argentine cuisine
Uruguayan cuisine
Fermented sausages